Oliva is a genus of medium-sized to large sea snails, marine gastropod mollusks in the subfamily Olivinae of thefamily Olividae, the olive snails or olive shells. Many former species of Oliva have been reclassified under genus Americoliva.

Species
According to the World Register of Marine Species, the genus Oliva includes the following accepted species:
 
 Oliva amethystina (Röding, 1798)
 Oliva amethystina guttata (Lamarck, 1811)
 Oliva angustata Marrat, 1868
 Oliva annulata (Gmelin, 1791) (nomen dubium)
 Oliva atalina Duclos, 1835
 Oliva athenia Duclos, 1835
 Oliva australis Duclos, 1835
 Oliva bahamasensis Petuch & Sargent, 1986
 Oliva baileyi Petuch, 1979
 † Oliva balteata Raven & Recourt, 2018 
 Oliva barbadensis Petuch & Sargent, 1986
 Oliva bathyalis Petuch & Sargent, 1986
 Oliva bayeri Petuch, 2001
 † Oliva bekenuensis Raven & Recourt, 2018 
 Oliva bewleyi Marrat, 1870
 Oliva bifasciata Kuster, 1878
 Oliva brettinghami Bridgman, 1909
 Oliva brunellae Cossignani, 2019
 Oliva buelowi G. B. Sowerby III, 1889
 Oliva bulbiformis Duclos, 1835
 Oliva bulbosa (Röding, 1798)
 Oliva caerulea (Röding, 1798)
 Oliva carneola (Gmelin, 1791)
 Oliva caroliniana Duclos, 1835
 Oliva chrysoplecta Tursch & Greifeneder, 1989
 Oliva circinata Marrat, 1871
 Oliva concavospira G. B. Sowerby III, 1914
 † Oliva curta Raven & Recourt, 2018 
 Oliva cylindrica Marrat, 1867
 Oliva dactyliola Duclos, 1835
 Oliva deynzerae Petuch & Sargent, 1986
 Oliva drangai Schwengel, 1951
 Oliva dubia Schepman, 1904
 Oliva elegans Lamarck, 1811
 Oliva emeliodina Duclos, 1845
 Oliva esiodina Duclos, 1844
 Oliva faba Marrat, 1867
 Oliva februaryana Falconieri, 2008
 Oliva figura Marrat, 1870
 Oliva fijiana Tursch & Greifeneder, 2001
 Oliva flammulata Lamarck, 1811
 Oliva fulgurator (Röding, 1798)
 Oliva goajira Petuch & Sargent, 1986
 Oliva grovesi (Petuch & R. F. Meyers, 2014)
 Oliva guttata Fischer von Waldheim, 1808
 Oliva harpularia Lamarck, 1811
 Oliva hilli Petuch & Sargent, 1986
 Oliva hirasei Kuroda & Habe, 1952
 Oliva incrassata (Lightfoot, 1786)
 Oliva irisans Lamarck, 1811
 Oliva jamaicensis Marrat, 1867
 Oliva joyceae Petuch & Sargent, 1986
 Oliva julieta Duclos, 1835
 Oliva keenii Marrat, 1870
 Oliva kerstitchi da Motta, 1985
 Oliva kohi Hunon, Rabiller & Richard, 2016
 Oliva kohi Hunon, Rabiller & Richard, 2016
 Oliva kurzi Petuch & Sargent, 1986
 Oliva lacanientai Greifeneder & Blöcher, 1985
 Oliva lamberti Jousseaume, 1884
 Oliva lecoquiana Ducros de Saint Germain, 1857
 Oliva leonardhilli Petuch & Sargent, 1986
 Oliva macleaya Duclos, 1840
 Oliva maculata Duclos, 1840
 Oliva mantichora Duclos, 1835
 Oliva matchetti (Petuch & R. F. Meyers, 2014)
 Oliva mcleani (Petuch & R. F. Meyers, 2014)
 Oliva mindanaoensis Petuch & Sargent, 1986
 Oliva miniacea (Röding, 1798)
 Oliva mooreana Petuch, 2013
 Oliva mucronata Marrat, 1871
 Oliva multiplicata Reeve, 1850
 Oliva mustelina Lamarck, 1811
 Oliva mustelina virgata Sterba, 2005
 Oliva neostina Duclos, 1840
 Oliva nitidula Duclos, 1835
 Oliva nivosa Marrat, 1871
 Oliva obesina Duclos, 1835
 Oliva oliva (Linnaeus, 1758)
 Oliva olssoni Petuch & Sargent, 1986
 Oliva ornata Marrat, 1867
 Oliva ouini Kantor & Tursch, 1998
 Oliva ozodona Duclos, 1835
 Oliva pacifica Marrat, 1870
 Oliva panniculata Duclos, 1835
 Oliva parkinsoni Prior, 1975
 Oliva pica Lamarck, 1811
 Oliva picta Reeve, 1850
 Oliva pindarina Duclos, 1835
 Oliva polita Marrat, 1867
 Oliva polpasta Duclos, 1833
 Oliva ponderosa Duclos, 1835
 Oliva porphyria (Linnaeus, 1758)
 Oliva reclusa Marrat, 1871
 Oliva recourti (Petuch & R. F. Meyers, 2014)
 Oliva reticularis Lamarck, 1811
 Oliva reticulata (Röding, 1798)
 Oliva rubrolabiata H. Fischer, 1903
 Oliva rufofulgurata Schepman, 1904
 Oliva rufula Duclos, 1835
 Oliva sargenti Petuch, 1987
 Oliva sayana Ravenel, 1834
 Oliva scripta Lamarck, 1811
 Oliva semmelinki Schepman, 1891
 Oliva sericea (Röding, 1798)
 Oliva sidelia Duclos, 1835
 Oliva spicata (Röding, 1798)
 Oliva subangulata Philippi, 1848
 Oliva sunderlandi Petuch, 1987
 † Oliva telescopica Raven & Recourt, 2019 
 Oliva tessellata Lamarck, 1811
 Oliva tigridella Duclos, 1835
 Oliva tigrina Lamarck, 1811
 Oliva timoria Duclos, 1840
 Oliva tisiphona Duclos, 1844 (nomen dubium)
 Oliva todosina Duclos, 1835
 Oliva tremulina Lamarck, 1811
 Oliva tricolor Lamarck, 1811
 Oliva truncata Marrat, 1867
 Oliva undatella Lamarck, 1811
 Oliva venulata Lamarck, 1811
 Oliva vicdani da Motta, 1982
 Oliva vicweei Recourt, 1989
 Oliva vidua (Röding, 1798)
 Oliva violacea Marrat, 1867
 Oliva westralis Petuch & Sargent, 1986
 Oliva weyderti Rosso, 1985 
 Oliva xenos Petuch & Sargent, 1986

Gallery

References

 “Olive shells: The genus Oliva and the species problem” by Bernard Tursch and Dietmar Greifeneder. L’Informatore Piceno, Italy and Bosque B. M. T., S. A., Costa Rica. pp. 1– 569 (including numerous b&w plates, text photographs, & drawings) + x + 48 color plates. 215 x 296 mm. Hard-bound. , 2001 (In English)
 Petuch E.J. & Sargent D.M. (1986). Atlas of the living olive shells of the world. xv + 253 pp., 39 pls.

External links 
 Gray J.E. (1847). A list of the genera of recent mollusca, their synonyma and types. Proceedings of the Zoological Society of London. 15: 129-219

 
Gastropod genera